3-hydroxyindolin-2-one monooxygenase (BX4 (gene), CYP71C1 (gene)) is an enzyme with systematic name 3-hydroxyindolin-2-one,NAD(P)H:oxygen oxidoreductase (2-hydroxy-2H-1,4-benzoxazin-3(4H)-one-forming). This enzyme catalyses the following chemical reaction

 3-hydroxyindolin-2-one + NAD(P)H + H+ + O2  2-hydroxy-2H-1,4-benzoxazin-3(4H)-one + NAD(P)+ + H2O

3-hydroxyindolin-2-one monooxygenase is involved in the biosynthesis of protective and allelopathic benzoxazinoids in some plants.

References

External links 
 

EC 1.14.13